is a professional Japanese baseball player. He plays pitcher for the Orix Buffaloes.

External links
 
 NPB.com

1994 births
Living people
Baseball people from Yokohama
Rissho University alumni
Japanese baseball players
Nippon Professional Baseball pitchers
Orix Buffaloes players